Vladimir Mikhailovich Kuchmiy (May 31, 1948 – 21 March 2009) was the founder and chief editor (from 1991 to 2009) of the Russian newspaper Sport Express.

Biography

Founder and Chief Editor of Sport Express
In August 1991, Kuchmiy (together with some reporters from then-USSR Sovetsky Sport newspaper) founded Sport Express as the first professional sports daily newspaper in Russia. He became the chief editor of the publication and kept this position until his death, largely influencing
the editorial policy but deliberately restraining himself from contributing to the newspaper. The circulation of the newspaper rose to 700,000 during Kuchmiy's editorship.

Death
Kuchmiy died on 21 March 2009 at the age of 60.

References

External links
 Биографическая справка
 Он был нашим всем

1948 births
2009 deaths
Russian newspaper editors
Soviet journalists
Russian sports journalists
Burials at Vagankovo Cemetery
Communist Party of the Soviet Union members
20th-century Russian journalists